Bruggeman is a surname. Notable people with the surname include:

Annefleur Bruggeman (born 1997), Dutch handball player
Dick Bruggeman (born 1942), American hurdler
Hans Bruggeman (1927–2016), Dutch politician
Molly Bruggeman (born 1992), American rower
Prosper Bruggeman (1873–?), Belgian rower
Rob Bruggeman (born 1986), American football player